Trumpler 2 is an open cluster located in the constellation Perseus. It is approximately 2000 light-years from Earth, placing its position within the Perseus Arm of the Milky Way Galaxy. Although at this large distance, it can be seen with the naked eye, at magnitude 6.

It has a central red star named HD 16068 of spectral type K3.5II-III, and is visually the brightest star of the cluster as seen from Earth.

See also
NGC 957 - a nearby open cluster

References

External links
 

Open clusters
Perseus (constellation)
Trumpler catalog